McDonald v. Smith, 472 U.S. 479 (1985), was a United States Supreme Court case in which the Court held that the right to petition does not provide absolute immunity to petitioners; it is subject to the same restrictions as other First Amendment rights.

Background 
In 1981, David Smith brought a libel suit against Robert McDonald claiming that Mcdonald had included knowing and malicious lies in a letter to the President concerning Smith's possible appointment as a United States attorney. Smith claimed that these libelous claims damaged both his chances of appointment and his reputation and career. McDonald first had the case removed to federal court on the basis of diversity of citizenship. Since the alleged libel was contained in a letter (petition) to the President, he moved for judgment on the pleadings on the grounds that the Petition Clause of the First Amendment protected his right to express his views without limitation as long as it was part of a constitutionally protected petition.

Opinion of the Court 
The issue before the Court was whether the right to petition the government granted absolute immunity from liability.

The Court decided 8–0 (Justice Powell took no part in the case) that the right to petition was subject to the same legal limitations that the rights to speech and the press are as previously decided in New York Times Co. v. Sullivan (1964). Therefore, claims made in the original letter, or in any similar petition, were and are subject to libel lawsuits to be judged on their merits. Chief Justice Burger delivered the opinion of the Court, in which all other members joined. Justice Brennan wrote a concurrence, joined by Justices Marshall and Blackmun.

References

External links
 

United States Supreme Court cases
United States defamation case law
Petition Clause case law
1985 in United States case law
United States Supreme Court cases of the Burger Court